WWE Hall of Fame (2016) was the event which featured the introduction of the 17th class to the WWE Hall of Fame. The event was produced by WWE on April 2, 2016 from the American Airlines Center in Dallas, Texas. The event took place the same weekend as WrestleMania 32. The event aired live on the WWE Network, and was hosted by Jerry Lawler. A condensed one-hour version of the ceremony aired the following Thursday on USA Network, after SmackDown.

Event
Due to the launch of the WWE Network shortly before WrestleMania XXX, this event featured the third ever "Red Carpet" event as a one-hour pre-show prior to the start of the event. The pre-show was hosted by Michael Cole, and Maria Menounos.

The Godfather was inducted by his long-term friend whom he often traveled the road with, the members of The Acolytes Protection Agency, John "Bradshaw" Layfield and Ron Simmons.

Stan Hansen was inducted by his overseas partner and rival Vader.

Jacqueline was inducted by The Dudley Boyz (Bubba Ray Dudley and D-Von Dudley).

In 2016, WWE introduced a new category for the Hall of Fame called the "Legacy" wing. Inductees under this new category feature wrestlers from the early years of professional wrestling, primarily during the early part of the 20th century. All inductees in 2016 are inducted posthumously and were recognized with a video package at the ceremony. Those inducted in the 2016 legacy category were Mildred Burke, Frank Gotch, George Hackenschmidt, Ed "Strangler" Lewis, Pat O'Connor, Lou Thesz and "Sailor" Art Thomas.

The Fabulous Freebirds were the group inductee into the Hall of Fame. Representing them were Michael Hayes, Terry Gordy (represented by his son, Ray Gordy), Buddy Roberts (represented by his son Buddy Roberts Jr.), Jimmy Garvin. The Freebirds were inducted by The New Day members Big E, Kofi Kingston, and Xavier Woods. Following their induction Hayes sang their song Badstreet U.S.A.

Big Boss Man was inducted by Slick. Due to his passing in 2004, his induction was accepted by his wife Angela and his daughters Lacy and Megan.

Snoop Dogg was inducted by John Cena. Snoop Dogg spoke about what it was like growing up a fan of professional wrestling, and gave what an honor it is to see his cousin Sasha Banks now wrestling for WWE.

Following The Ultimate Warrior's death in April 2014,  WWE introduced the Warrior Award, in 2015, for those who have "exhibited unwavering strength and perseverance, and who lives life with the courage and compassion that embodies the indomitable spirit of the Ultimate Warrior." Joan Lunden became the second recipient of The Warrior Award. The Ultimate Warrior's wife Dana inducted Lunden and spoke of her recent return to the public eye and openly discussing her breast cancer diagnosis in addition to becoming a spokeswoman for Susan G. Komen.

Sting was the final inductee and was inducted by Ric Flair. Sting spoke about what a long journey it was to come to WWE, and how proud he was to finally be in WWE. Sting then announced that he wanted to retire in WWE and used the opportunity to officially announce his retirement. Despite this, Sting later debuted in rival promotion All Elite Wrestling (AEW) in late 2020, coming out of retirement, and competed in his first match in over five years at AEW's Revolution pay-per-view on March 7, 2021.

Inductees

Individual
 Class headliners appear in boldface

Group

Celebrity

Warrior Award

Legacy

References

WWE Hall of Fame ceremonies
2016 in professional wrestling
2016 in Texas
Events in Dallas
Professional wrestling in the Dallas–Fort Worth metroplex
April 2016 events in the United States